William Francis Molden (July 28, 1942 – January 6, 2023) was an American football defensive tackle in the National Football League for the Los Angeles Rams, the Philadelphia Eagles, and the New York Giants.  He played college football at Jackson State University and was drafted in the eleventh round of the 1965 NFL Draft by the Pittsburgh Steelers.  Molden was also selected in the fifth round of the 1965 AFL Draft by the Houston Oilers.

Molden was the husband of Ruth Molden of Moss Point, Mississippi and they had three children. Molden died on January 6, 2023, at the age of 80.

References

1942 births
2023 deaths
American football defensive tackles
Jackson State Tigers football players
Los Angeles Rams players
New York Giants players
Philadelphia Eagles players
People from Moss Point, Mississippi
Players of American football from Mississippi